The German-language surname Münzer (also transliterated as Muenzer) may refer to:

 Friedrich Münzer (1868–1942), German classical scholar
 Hieronymus Münzer (1437/47–1508), Renaissance humanist
 Thomas Müntzer (ca. 1488 – 1525), Reformation Anabaptist theologian/politician
 Andreas Münzer (1964–1994), Austrian born heavyweight bodybuilder